The Soul2Soul 2000 Tour was the first joint concert tour by American country singers, and husband and wife, Tim McGraw and Faith Hill. The concert tour began in Atlanta in July 2000, and ended later that year in December in Orlando.  The tour's shows featured an opening set by Hill, then a set by McGraw, followed by some songs performed jointly.  The tour reflected both the successful marriage of the two artists as well as their very different styles and the dual directions country music was going in at the time.

The tour grossed nearly $50 million and was witnessed by close to 950,000 people. 60 of the 65 reported shows were sold-out.  It was fifth highest grossing of any genre in North America, and the leading country music tour, during 2000.  An estimated 1 million people attended the shows.  The pairing of the musically divergent couple led to Pollstar giving the tour its second-most important Concert Industry Award, that of Most Creative Tour Package for 2000.

History
This was not the first time the two had toured together: Hill was McGraw's opening act on his 1996 Spontaneous Combustion Tour, which is where they first met.  The Soul2Soul Tour was in support of their most recent albums at the time, McGraw's A Place In The Sun and Hill's mega-success Breathe. The tour was originally set to run July through October, however, following unexpected success (the opening leg grossed $18 million), the tour was extended into the end of the year.

The opening night at the Philips Arena in Atlanta was sold out, but so many fans showed up looking to get in that the local promoter opened up a section behind the stage and let the fans in.

At the Madison Square Garden show in New York City – where a local radio host proclaimed the show the biggest country concert ever to hit the city  – McGraw's father Tug McGraw was in attendance, as was New York Yankee pitcher Roger Clemens, who appeared onstage to bring Tim McGraw a Bud Lite.

After the tour concluded, McGraw toured on a solo basis, but Hill did not, until the couple staged their next joint production, the more elaborate and even more commercially successful Soul2Soul II Tour 2006.

The stage and the show
The show featured a unique 360 degree endstage that allowed for full arena capacity, with a catwalk and raised podiums on either side of the stage and a riser from below for performer entrances.   It took almost 100 roadies to move the production from city to city.

The show was presented as two self-contained sets.  Hill would perform first, followed by a short intermission and then McGraw would take the stage. In a sense Hill was still an opening act for McGraw, as the applause generally indicated that the majority of the audience was clearly there to see McGraw.  The couple's music was very different at this stage of their careers, as Hill was exploring pop, techno and programmed drums, and 1960s retro sounds, while McGraw stuck to his more mainstream country approach.

After McGraw's set, a video montage was presented of the couple's family, then the two returned to close the show with five duets; the show closer was a rendition of Fleetwood Mac's "Go Your Own Way".

Critical reception
CMT News wrote that "Go Your Own Way" represented "a clear-cut declaration of where country music finds itself today, aimed at Gen-Xers and baby boomers and drifting more into the pop realm than ever before."  Rolling Stone said that in the show, "McGraw and Hill provided an interesting contrast in the differences between country and not country, pop country and pop pop."  The San Francisco Chronicle found the "Go Your Own Way" ending, with the couple singing from opposite ends of the stage, "a little unclear on the concept: Country music's most happily marrieds were singing a bitter breakup song from rock's most famous divorce album to end their show."

Some critics reacted unfavorably to Hill's performance, criticizing her as a "vacuous and wooden entertainer", "lack[ing] identity [and singing] cotton candy", with a "voice [that] comes across as thin ... exposing...absolutely nothing in resembling personality."  Her rendition of Janis Joplin's "Piece of My Heart" came in particular for poor notices.  One newspaper mentioned "her face full of Revlon", and indeed it was later reported that her makeup kit for the tour was a 300-pound case on seven wheels, designed specifically for her at $4,000 cost.  Other writers praised Hill, saying she "belted it out with the best of them", and praising her performance of her "There Will Come a Day".

Set list
Hill
"What's In It For Me?"
"The Way You Love Me"
"If My Heart Had Wings"
"Wild One"
"I've Got My Baby"
"The Secret of Life"
 "That's How Love Moves" 1
"Let Me Let Go"
"Breathe"
"It Matters To Me"
"Love Child" 1
"Piece of My Heart"
"Let's Go to Vegas"
"Where Are You, Christmas?" 1
"There Will Come A Day"
"This Kiss"
McGraw
"Indian Outlaw" 
"Heartbroken Again" 1
"Where the Green Grass Grows"
"Something Like That"
"Refried Dreams"
"Everywhere"
"Don't Take the Girl"
"Just to See You Smile"
"For a Little While"
"Down On the Farm"
"The Joker"
"Seventeen" 
"Some Things Never Change"
"All I Want"
"I Like It, I Love It"
Hill/McGraw
"It's Your Love"
"Let Me Love You"
"Angry All the Time"
"Let's Make Love"
"Go Your Own Way"

1 Performed at select shows

Opening acts
Keith Urban served as an unannounced opening act at some shows.  The Warren Brothers also opened some shows.

Tour dates

References

2000 concert tours
Tim McGraw and Faith Hill concert tours
Tim McGraw concert tours
Co-headlining concert tours